The 1996 True Value 200 was the first round of the 1996–1997 Indy Racing League. The race was held on August 18, 1996, at the  New Hampshire International Speedway in Loudon, New Hampshire. This race was dominated, but not won, by Tony Stewart, who passed Arie Luyendyk on lap 15 and led 165 laps until he suffered an engine computer failure, with 18 laps to go and a nearly three-lap lead. 1996 Indy Racing League co-champion Scott Sharp went on to win the race.

Report

Pre-Race
Due to the Indy Racing League's original wish to end every season at the Indianapolis 500, New Hampshire would host the 1996–1997 season opener on August 18, a race that had been counter-scheduled by CART with the 1996 Texaco/Havoline 200, which would be held on the same day at Road America. During the 11-week hiatus between seasons, Eliseo Salazar took part in four CART Indy Car events with Dick Simon Racing, teaming with Michel Jourdain Jr. the week after Indy at Milwaukee, and at Portland before going solo for Michigan, where he finished 11th, and Mid-Ohio. Jourdain also competed at Detroit, and both Richie Hearn and Robbie Buhl (the latter in the Indy Lights event) joined Atlantics regular Stan Wattles at the tragic Toronto weekend.

Tony Stewart also took part in four NASCAR events, scoring his first top-10 in his Truck Series debut at Indianapolis Raceway Park, and Scott Sharp grabbed another win in his second IMSA GT outing of the year at Sonoma Raceway, with John Paul Jr. in third place. Previously, Sharp was one of four IRL regular competitors who took part in the 24 Hours of Le Mans, along Michele Alboreto, Fermín Vélez and Mark Dismore, the only one whose car saw the checkered flag. Indy 500 runner-up Davy Jones was a part of the overall race winning team.

Pre-season testing for the IRL started at Las Vegas Motor Speedway, a new oval track on which the IRL would cut the ribbon in September. 20 drivers took part in a 3-day test on June 26–28, with 12 regular drivers being joined by Mark Dismore, who had driven with Team Menard at Indianapolis. Dismore had been signed on a permanent basis, replacing the late Scott Brayton. Richie Hearn set a first unofficial track record with a 222.359 mph lap, and nine drivers went over 210 mph. In that test, the Brickell Racing car prepared by PDM Racing continued its role as a 'mule' for USAC's drivers test.

A short-lived run by Joe Gosek was followed by Andy Michner, who passed a refresher test, and by Dave Blaney, the reigning World of Outlaws sprint car champion at the time, who fell five laps short of passing his test after his engine blew. Doug Kalitta and Jack Hewitt were also scheduled to take part, although they never took a lap. New Zealand's Rob Wilson, who didn't qualify for the Indy 500, also passed a refresher test with Foyt. On the last day of testing, three Indy 500 entrants took some laps, with Brad Murphey driving for Hemelgarn Racing, Billy Roe with Team Blueprint Racing, and Randy Tolsma for McCormack Motorsports, a team that was embarking in an effort on its own after running the Zunne Group Racing operation in the Indy 500.

Additionally, Goodyear held private tests at New Hampshire on July 8–10, with A. J. Foyt Enterprises (Scott Sharp and Davey Hamilton), Pagan Racing (Roberto Guerrero), Della Penna Motorsports (Richie Hearn) and Team Scandia (Eliseo Salazar), on which Hearn suffered a hard crash during the first day, although he was uninjured. During that month, Jonathan Byrd's Racing announced the end of their partnership with Treadway Racing to become partners with Cunningham Racing. Mike Groff, who had driven for Foyt and Walker Racing during the year, was selected as their driver, replacing Johnny O'Connell, who would remain on New Hampshire's entry list before being 'scratched'. Also, McCormack Motorsports announced the signing of an injury-free Stan Wattles, who was on the sidelines after Leigh Miller Racing's assets were bought by Beck Motorsports that spring.

On August 5, the entry list for New Hampshire was released, with the absence of Johnny Parsons in Blueprint's No. 16, as well as some driver changes. After being released by Team Menard, Eddie Cheever bought the car he had been using to form his own team, and Stéphan Grégoire left Hemelgarn Racing to drive in Team Scandia, subbing for Michel Jourdain Jr. in that race. Scandia also fielded a fourth car for Marco Greco, who had hired the services of the Arizona Motorsports rental crew headed by Jeff Sinden. McCormack Motorsports announced a second entry for Randy Tolsma that would be eventually scratched, Tempero–Giuffre Racing entered sportscar gentleman Jon Field, and ABF Motorsports entered supermodified driver Mike Ordway. In the following days, PDM Racing entered Tyce Carlson in its second car, and it was confirmed that the Indy Racing League would be visiting Pikes Peak International Raceway, another new oval, with a date set for July 27, 1997.

Practice and qualifying

An IRL open test at NHIS planned for July 23–25 was cancelled after some NASCAR drivers complained that the track was breaking up in some spots during the Jiffy Lube 300 two weeks earlier. Therefore, IRL officials scheduled two days of testing on August 14–15, prior to the start of practice. The first day was reserved for USAC's driver tests. After Tyce Carlson passed a refresher test, his car was used by NASCAR Whelen Modified drivers Tim Connolly, who passed his test, and Ted Christopher, who run out of time in his attempt after completing three fases. Five other drivers (Divina Galica, Reggie Ruggiero, Ed Flemke Jr., Tom Cravenho and Tony Turco) were left waiting for their opportunity.

Tempero–Giuffre assigned their second car to sportscar and occasional Indy Lights driver Juan Carlos Carbonell, who had been partnering Jon Field in selected IMSA rounds, but the team had to withdraw both of them, as Carbonell did not complete his test and Field crashed in Turn 1 before being approved. ABF Motorsports had switched Ordway for USAC Silver Crown talent Dave Steele, but he also crashed in Turn 4 before completing his test. During the second day, Hemelgarn Racing confirmed that Brad Murphey would be driving the No. 9 car previously used by Stéphan Grégoire, and Tempero–Giuffre announced the return of David Kudrave, while Project Indy, initially absent in the first entry list, returned to competition with Johnny Unser, their regular driver. Unser and Kudrave were among a group of 10 entered drivers who had previous Indy car experience at New Hampshire, with Eliseo Salazar, Eddie Cheever, Marco Greco and Buddy Lazier having taken part in the 1995 race; Unser, Scott Sharp, Mike Groff and Arie Luyendyk had started the 1994 race, while Roberto Guerrero, with a 4th-place finish, and Kudrave had been part of the 1993 event.

Richie Hearn dominated on Friday, leading a rain affected morning practice with a 175.335 mph lap, followed by Arie Luyendyk and Tony Stewart, and the afternoon practice at 172.297 mph, in front of Mark Dismore and Stewart. In that session, Johnny Unser lost control of his car, crashed in Turn 2 and travelled all the way down the back straight without steering until he crashed in Turn 3 again. The car was lost for the weekend, and Project Indy withdrew from the event. On Saturday morning, Michele Alboreto jumped to the front with a 173.364 mph lap, beating Stewart and Buddy Lazier. Also, ABF Motorsports returned to the track, with Joe Gosek at the wheel of the No. 96, and Brad Murphey crashed in Turn 2, leaving himself out of qualifying.

After a few runs had been completed in qualifying, Buddy Lazier set the pace with a 172.664 mph lap. That mark was surpassed by Michele Alboreto, who registered a 175.125 mph. The Italian veteran was close to obtain the pole position after Tony Stewart, Mark Dismore and Arie Luyendyk fell short, but Richie Hearn got to set the two fastest laps of the day, securing his first Indy car pole position at 175.367 mph, two miles short of André Ribeiro's 177.436 mph track record, yet fast enough for a 4th place spot in the 1995 grid. Luyendyk and Lazier completed the second row, while Dismore qualified in a career-best fifth place, in front of Eliseo Salazar and Stewart. Further behind, John Paul Jr. soldiered his 1993 Lola to an 11th place, between IRL co-champions Buzz Calkins and Scott Sharp. His teammate Tyce Carlson, qualifying for his first Indy car race, only got to do a single lap after missing his qualifying turn, but it was good enough for 16th place, in front of favourites Davey Hamilton and Roberto Guerrero.

  Couldn't qualify after his chassis had been damaged in a practice crash. He was allowed to start the race at the back of the field.

Failed to qualify or withdrew
 Johnny Unser for Project Indy

Race
In front of 24.000 espectators, Richie Hearn kept the lead when the green flag was waved, while Arie Luyendyk passed Michele Alboreto for second place. The first caution came out immediately, as Jim Guthrie had lost control of his car accelerating off Turn 4 due to a leak, and Robbie Buhl had found the Turn 1 wall after being loose. The race was restarted on Lap 7, and Luyendyk took advantage to overtake Hearn in Turn 3, taking the lead. Having started in seventh place, Stewart had already overtaken Eliseo Salazar and a slow starting Mark Dismore at the start, and got in front of Buddy Lazier during the restart, kick-starting his dominating performance. He soon caught the leading trio on Lap 11 and, helped by traffic, grabbed the lead on Lap 14. Amid concerns that Menard's limited fuel mileage would cost him an additional pit stop, he started to pull away at a fast rate, lapping at least a full second per lap faster than anyone else: by Lap 25, he had a 10-second lead, increased to 22 seconds by Lap 30.

Scott Sharp had climbed to the top 10, and was running in eighth place, while Hearn faded to fifth place and Lazier overtook Alboreto on Lap 29 for third place. Both would be lapped by Stewart five laps later. Before the leader could catch Luyendyk, a second caution came out when Joe Gosek, running in 17th place, spun and crashed in Turn 4. Luyendyk, Lazier, Alboreto, Sharp, Davey Hamilton, Buzz Calkins and Mike Groff elected not to pit to regain their lap, although Hamilton and Calkins would not keep the pace in green flag conditions. Stewart came out of his stop in second place, behind Luyendyk, but 10 seconds away from Lazier. His teammate Mark Dismore, who pitted just behind Stewart, spun exiting his pit box and was left backwards, having to make a 180º burnout. In doing so, he ran over an air hose, being granted a Stop & Go penalty, and retired a few laps later after damaging his clutch in the burnout. The situation resembled a similar half-spin by Eddie Cheever at the Indianapolis 500, also in front of Stewart's pit box when he was his teammate, although Stewart had already left before Dismore spun.

Despite restarting with a 3-second gap on Lap 41, Luyendyk's lead lasted two further laps, as Stewart continued to obliterate the field. Sharp passed Alboreto for fourth place at the restart, and Buddy Lazier passed Luyendyk for second on Lap 64, but the Indy 500 winner had Stewart already in his mirrors three laps later, and was instructed to not let him pass. On Lap 68, Stewart dived into the inside of Lazier in Turn 3 and both drivers touched, the slight contact sending Lazier into the wall. Lazier, who was still partially competing with the back injuries he had suffered at Phoenix, was uninjured but very angry at Stewart's maneuver, being heard using profanities on ABC's broadcast, for which he later apologized. Despite the contact, Stewart only suffered cosmetical damages on his front wing.

The race restarted on Lap 77, and Stewart officially run in a lap of his own from Lap 81 after passing Richie Hearn, the only top 10 driver who had not pitted. Around the halfway mark, Team Menard started worrying about a loss of telemetry and a misfiring engine, both issues seemingly being solved a few laps later. On Lap 102, he lapped fifth-placed Michele Alboreto, who would lose his spot to Mike Groff 13 laps later. With clouds looming on the track, Sharp got close to Luyendyk, forcing the Treadway driver to up his pace and pursue Hearn, before Sharp himself caught both of them. Hearn had a pending pit stop, and he decided to take it on Lap 123, but a caution for rain came out just seconds before, and Hearn had to drive by the closed pits, losing second place to Luyendyk.

A lap later, a heavy rain shower forced a 45-minute red flag period. At the restart on Lap 127, Hearn was passed on track by Scott Sharp. Stewart kept on with his domination, lapping Hearn on Lap 144 and Sharp on Lap 149 for a second time. On Lap 152, Luyendyk started developing problems with his right front wheel and had lost direction. Despite being out of the race for 30 laps, he got out on track in the final stages of the race to score additional points. Hearn also had to do an unscheduled pit stop on Lap 161 to remove a piece of debris from his radiator and fell to sixth, ten laps before retiring due to an engine overheating believed to have developed in the previous stoppage.

Lapping consistently into the 165 mph range, and taking half a second off Sharp per lap in average, Stewart was comfortably heading to an undisputed victory, and was seconds away from gaining a third lap on the field. The only concern for Team Menard was knowing when to make the last pit stop without running out of fuel. With 18 laps to go, while Team Menard was preparing for the pit stop, Stewart's car sustained an electrical failure coming out of turn 2, and he pitted afterwards, but the car shut down in the pits. Every attempt to revive the engine was futile, forcing Stewart to retire. Sharp inherited the lead and, with all his rivals having dropped out, the Foyt driver had a 20 seconds lead over Mike Groff. Sharp, however, was nursing the car, as his team feared being too short on fuel to make it to the finish without an additional pit stop.

While allowing both Michele Alboreto and Buzz Calkins to unlap themselves, Sharp maintained the gap and went on to achieve his first Indy car win, which was also a first for the Lola chassis and Goodyear tires in the IRL, the first for A. J. Foyt's team since his last as a driver at the 1981 Pocono 500, and the second by any Foyt's driver after Jim McElreath's victory at the 1970 Ontario 500. Buzz Calkins passed Michele Alboreto with nine laps to go and held off a late charge to finish second, as Groff fell to fourth after pitting for a splash with 6 laps to go. Also, Davey Hamilton –fifth– and Marco Greco –seventh– got their first top-10 finish. Further behind, Eliseo Salazar lost several laps with fuel issues, and Eddie Cheever's first race as a driver-owner, having run as high as seventh, was soon ruined by brakes and engine problems.

Race Statistics
Lead changes: 5 among 4 drivers

Standings after the race

Drivers' Championship standings

 Note: Only the top five positions are included for the standings.

References

True Value 200
New Hampshire Indy 225
1996 in sports in New Hampshire